Streptomyces badius is a bacterium species from the genus of Streptomyces which has been isolated from soil in Kaukasus in Russia. Streptomyces badius produces cutinase.
Streptomyces badius can metabolize quinoxaline.

See also 
 List of Streptomyces species

References

Further reading

External links
Type strain of Streptomyces badius at BacDive -  the Bacterial Diversity Metadatabase

badius
Bacteria described in 1958